Jan Říha (11 November 1915 – 15 December 1995) was a Czech football player. He played for Czechoslovakia, for which he played 25 matches and scored 9 goals.

He was a participant in the 1938 FIFA World Cup.

References 

1915 births
1995 deaths
Czech footballers
Czechoslovak footballers
AC Sparta Prague players
1938 FIFA World Cup players
Czechoslovakia international footballers
Sportspeople from Písek
Association football forwards